Beacon is the second studio album by Northern Irish indie rock band Two Door Cinema Club, released on 31 August 2012 by Kitsuné. The album was recorded in Los Angeles with producer Jacknife Lee in his home studio.

Promotion
Two Door Cinema Club teased a second album throughout 2010 and 2011, frequently playing the songs "Handshake", "Settle", "Sleep Alone", and "Wake Up" live before the album was announced. "Sleep Alone" was released as the lead single from Beacon on 20 July 2012. The album's second single, "Sun", was released on 16 November 2012. "Next Year" was released as the album's third single on 15 February 2013, followed by "Handshake" on 31 May 2013. The album was reissued on 28 October 2013 including the song "Changing of the Seasons", which was released as the lead single from the EP of the same name.

What We See
From 24 August to 10 September 2012, the band released a four-part documentary titled What We See, which depicts their European summer tour prior to the release of Beacon. In relation to touring, lead singer Trimble explained, "The past few years have sort have been not necessarily a struggle, but a learning curve. So it's learning to be in touch with the people you leave behind and learning to just deal with the ridiculousness of it all." The documentary was filmed by Gregg Houston (Babysweet Sessions), a friend of the band.

Critical reception

Beacon received generally positive reviews from music critics. At Metacritic, which assigns a normalised rating out of 100 to reviews from mainstream publications, the album received an average score of 62, based on 18 reviews. Katherine Rodgers of NME stated the album "blitzes in on a flurry of discordant, M83-style synth-fuzz, and while it doesn't stray far from their trademark tinkly guitar lines and infectious choruses, it's laced with New Order-ish disco trimmings." Ray Rahman of Entertainment Weekly commented the album "tempers its galloping pop gait with frontman Alex Trimble's Ben Gibbard-y confessionals. And at their best, tracks like 'Sleep Alone' and 'Wake Up' come off like a less grandstanding Killers—human and dancer." Megan Farokhmanesh of Paste wrote that "Beacon isn't a step up from Tourist History, but rather a brother to it", while stating that "[t]here's very little progression or change in their sound, but that doesn't necessarily have to be a bad thing." The Irish Times Lauren Murphy opined that Beacon "may not be as instantly gratifying as Tourist History, but with producer Jacknife Lee's guidance the band have plumbed deeper songwriting depths and turned in some fantastic songs." In a review for the Evening Standard, Rick Pearson found that on Beacon, the band "share Snow Patrol's fondness for a big picture and even bigger sound but they are altogether lighter on their feet". Davey Boy of Sputnikmusic viewed Beacon as "a wise and predictably executed record in all the right ways", as well as "a more even, consistent and cohesive LP than Tourist History, even if it does not reach the same individual heights."

AllMusic editor Heather Phares felt that "much of the nervy, scrappy energy that made Tourist History so appealing is missing from Beacon", concluding, "There's nothing overtly bad about Beacon; it shows that Two Door Cinema Club still have a remarkable knack for winsome melodies and harmonies set to kinetic beats." The Guardians Dave Simpson expressed, "'Next Year's fleeting Beach Boys/Beatles harmonies aside, there aren't too many departures from what made them successful: radio-friendly songs with intricate little catchy bits which may find new homes as advertising jingles." Despite dubbing Beacon "another competent album of breezy indie-pop tunes" and praising Trimble's "songwriting gift", Martin Headon of musicOMH found it to be "a rather dissatisfying listen", concluding, "With only one true standout track, a handful of fillers, and little innovation or progress, it reeks of diminishing returns from start to finish." Aoife Ryan of State Magazine claimed that "[t]hough producer Jacknife Lee is sure to make the album profitable, it is still hit and miss with many of the same faults as the first one", further stating, "At its worst it is formulaic with saccharine lyrics but on occasion it does hint that they have something more to give." Paul Mardles of The Observer argued that "while [Beacon] is polished, thanks no doubt to U2 producer Jacknife Lee, there is nothing to distinguish Two Door Cinema Club from several other excitable indie-disco bands", adding that aside from "Sun", Beacon is "prosaic and frenetic, its tireless synths and fidgety guitars unable to camouflage the group's dearth of ideas."

Commercial performance
Beacon debuted at number one on the Irish Albums Chart, becoming the band's first number-one album on the chart. In the United Kingdom, the album debuted at number two on the UK Albums Chart, selling 33,306 copies in its first week. On 15 October 2021, the album was certified platinum by the British Phonographic Industry (BPI), denoting shipments in excess of 300,000 copies in the UK.

In the United States, the album debuted at number 17 on the Billboard 200, and number seven on Top Rock Albums, selling 16,000 copies in its first week. It had sold 110,000 copies in the US as of September 2016.

Track listing

Personnel
Credits adapted from the liner notes of Beacon.

Two Door Cinema Club
 Alex Trimble – vocals, guitar, synths, piano, keyboards, drums, percussion, programming
 Kevin Baird – bass guitar, synths, vocals
 Sam Halliday – guitar, synths, vocals

Additional personnel

 Jacknife Lee – production, additional recording, programming
 Mike Crossey – mixing
 Sam Bell – recording
 Matt Bishop – additional recording, editing
 Robin Schmidt – mastering
 Eric Gorfain – orchestration 
 Valentina – vocals 
 Megaforce – artwork, photography
 Damien Ropero – photography
 Eva Provence – cover model
 Matthieu Botrel – set design
 Charlotte Balme – styling
 Felix Mondino – artwork production
 Pablo Amati – retouching
 Emiliano Serantoni – retouching

Charts

Weekly charts

Year-end charts

Certifications

Release history

Notes

References

2012 albums
Albums produced by Jacknife Lee
Glassnote Records albums
Two Door Cinema Club albums